Alucita araxella is a moth of the family Alucitidae. It is found in south-eastern Armenia.

References

Moths described in 2000
Alucitidae
Moths of Asia